The 2000 IIHF World U18 Championships were held in Kloten and Weinfelden, Switzerland. The championships ran between April 14 and April 24, 2000. Games were played at Eishalle Schluefweg in Kloten and Sportanlage Güttingersreuti in Weinfelden. Finland defeated Russia 3–1 in the final to win the gold medal, while Sweden defeated Switzerland 7–1 to capture the bronze medal.

Championship results

Preliminary round

Group A

Group B

Relegation Round

Note: The following matches from the preliminary round carry forward to the relegation round:
 April 18, 2000:  4–4 
 April 18, 2000:  1–9

Final round

Quarterfinals

Semifinals

Fifth place game

Bronze medal game

Gold medal game

Final standings

 is relegated to Division I for the 2001 IIHF World U18 Championships.

Scoring leaders

Source: IIHF

Goaltending leaders

(minimum 40% team's total ice time)

Source: IIHF

Group B

First round

Final round

Final ranking

European Championships Division I

First round

Placing round

European Championships Division II Qualification

Group A (in Reykjavík, Iceland)

Group B (in Sofia, Bulgaria)

European Championships Division II

First round

Placing round

References

External links
Official results and statistics from the International Ice Hockey Federation
Championship

IIHF World U18 Championships
IIHF World U18 Championships
International ice hockey competitions hosted by Switzerland
World
April 2000 sports events in Europe